Riacho de Santana may refer to the following places in Brazil:

Riacho de Santana, Bahia
Riacho de Santana, Rio Grande do Norte